Ryan Patrick Armour (born February 27, 1976) is an American professional golfer.

His father is David Armour and his mother is Jude Armour of Silver Lake, Ohio. His grandfather was Frank Armour Jr. of Pittsburgh, Pennsylvania who was president of H.J. Heinz Co. 

Armour attended Ohio State University. He earned third-team All-American honors in 1998 and was selected to the All-Big Ten squad in 1995 and 1998. He also made it to the 1993 U.S. Junior Amateur Golf Championship final, losing to Tiger Woods on the first playoff hole.

Armour played on the Nationwide Tour, now Korn Ferry Tour from 2004 to 2006. He also played on the NGA Hooters Tour in 2002 and 2003 and the Golden Bear Tour in 2003.

Armour earned his card for the 2007 PGA Tour season by finishing T13 at Q-School in 2006. He also qualified for the FedEx Cup in 2007.

After finishing 172nd on the PGA Tour money list in 2008, Armour lost his PGA Tour card and had to go back to the Nationwide Tour for 2009, where he played through 2012 and again in 2014. He finished 20th in the Web.com Tour regular season, then 40th in the Web.com Tour Finals to earn his PGA Tour card for the 2014–15 season.

In 2014–15, he finished 195th on the FedEx points list: 200th was the cutoff for a place in the Web.com Tour Finals. He then finished 41st (excluding the Top 25) in the Finals, to earn a Web.com Tour card for 2016.

In 2016, he won the first event of the Web.com Tour season, the Panama Claro Championship. It was his first win on the tour, in his 217th tournament. The next season, he won the Sanderson Farms Championship, his first PGA Tour win in his 105th start.

Professional wins (2)

PGA Tour wins (1)

Web.com Tour wins (1)

Results in major championships
Results not in chronological order before 2019.

CUT = missed the half-way cut
"T" = tied

Results in The Players Championship

CUT = missed the halfway cut
WD = withdrew
C = Canceled after the first round due to the COVID-19 pandemic

See also
2006 PGA Tour Qualifying School graduates
2014 Web.com Tour Finals graduates
2016 Web.com Tour Finals graduates
2017 Web.com Tour Finals graduates
2022 Korn Ferry Tour Finals graduates

References

External links

American male golfers
Ohio State Buckeyes men's golfers
PGA Tour golfers
Korn Ferry Tour graduates
Golfers from Ohio
Sportspeople from Akron, Ohio
1976 births
Living people
21st-century American people